Maggie Malone-Hardin (née Malone; born December 30, 1993) is an American track and field athlete competing in the javelin throw. She holds a personal record of 67.40 meters (221 feet, 2 inches) for the event, set in 2021, a national record. She was the 2016 American national and collegiate record holder and NCAA Division 1 champion. She is the American collegiate record holder. Maggie and Sam Hardin married in 2022.

Prep
Born to Danny Malone and Nancy Kindig-Malone in College Station, Texas and raised in Geneva, Nebraska, Maggie attended Fillmore Central High School where her parents are teachers and coaches. Her mother All-American collegiately for the Nebraska Cornhuskers and she followed her mother's example was recruited to the University of Nebraska–Lincoln. Nancy Kindig-Malone qualified for the 1970 US Olympics. Nancy induction into the Nebraska High School Sports Hall of Fame. She won Big Eight heptathlon and pentathlon titles at Nebraska, becoming an All-American and helping the Huskers win their first indoor national championship in 1982. Nancy also won a Class C state basketball title with Hastings St. Cecilia High School in 1977.
Maggie won 2012 Class C Nebraska School Activities Association state long jump title , state triple jump bronze medal jumping , 5th in 200 meters in 26.63 and 2011 Class C Nebraska School Activities Association state triple jump title.

NCAA
Maggie Malone earned 4 NCAA Division I U.S. Track & Field and Cross Country Coaches Association All-American awards.

She started out in the heptathlon, placing 5th at 2013 Kansas Relays scoring 4369 points, but decided to focus on her strongest event – the javelin. In her first year of competition in 2013 she placed third at the Big Ten Conference championships and was tenth at the 2013 NCAA Outdoor Championships.

Malone transferred to Texas A&M University and began throwing for the Texas A&M Aggies track team. In her first year in College Station, Texas, she was fourth at the Southeastern Conference (SEC) Championships and placed ninth at the NCAAs, failing to build on her previous season. Malone described this as "the worst season I've ever had" and credited the advice of teammate Lindon Victor with her change of approach to train harder in the summer months. Her sister Audrey joined her in the javelin team at Texas A&M.

She showed marked improvement in the 2016 season, bettering her personal record by a wide margin. A victory at the 2016 United States Olympic Trials soon followed, making her the first athlete in American history to win the collegiate and national titles in the same year. This gained her a place on the American Olympic team.

National titles
USA Outdoor Track and Field Championships
Javelin throw: 2016
NCAA Women's Division I Outdoor Track and Field Championships
Javelin throw: 2016

Professional
In August 2022, Maggie Malone-Hardin moved to coach at University of Nebraska–Lincoln.

Olympic Games
Malone has represented the United States in two editions of the Olympic games, 2016 and 2020 (the latter was actually held in 2021 due to the Covid-19 pandemic). In 2016 she finished 25th in the qualifying round with a throw of 56.47 m and thus did not qualify for the finals. In 2020 she had the second-best throw in the qualifying round, 63.07 m, and in the final placed 10th with a throw of 59.82 m.

Malone signed to Nike and began throwing in Fall 2017 and is training for US Outdoor Track and Field Championships. As a Master graduate student in marketing (c/o 2019), Malone trains at Texas A&M with Juan De La Garza.

US Outdoor Track and Field Championship

References

External links

Living people
1993 births
Track and field athletes from Texas
People from College Station, Texas
Christians from Texas
American female javelin throwers
Texas A&M Aggies women's track and field athletes
Nebraska Cornhuskers women's track and field athletes
Athletes (track and field) at the 2016 Summer Olympics
Athletes (track and field) at the 2020 Summer Olympics
Olympic track and field athletes of the United States
USA Outdoor Track and Field Championships winners